Ian "Pete" Geoghegan, (26 April 1939 – 15 November 2003) was an Australian race car driver, known for a quick wit and natural driving skills. Sometimes referred to as "Pete" Geoghegan, he was one of the iconic characters of the 1960s and 1970s Australian motor racing scene. His older brother Leo was also an accomplished driver and the brothers often shared a car in endurance events.

He was a five-time winner of the Australian Touring Car Championship, a feat matched by only three other drivers since (Dick Johnson, Mark Skaife and Jamie Whincup). He achieved this string of victories driving against competitors of the highest calibre, such as Bob Jane, Norm Beechey and Allan Moffat. He also won the prestigious Bathurst 1000 endurance race in 1973, driving an XA Falcon GT with Moffat for the Ford Works Team.

Later in his career Geoghegan drove a Porsche Carrera to win the 1976 Australian Sports Car Championship, while also driving a Holden HQ Monaro in the Australian Sports Sedan Championship.
Geoghegan was inducted into the V8 Supercars Hall of Fame in 1999.

Career results
The following table lists the results obtained by Ian Geoghegan in the various national motor racing titles and major endurance races in which he competed.

Complete Australian Touring Car Championship results
(key) (Races in bold indicate pole position) (Races in italics indicate fastest lap)

Complete Phillip Island/Bathurst 500/1000 results

References
 Sydney Morning Herald 
 Racing Geoghegans 
 www.camsmanual.com.au

1939 births
2003 deaths
Australian racing drivers
Bathurst 1000 winners
Australian Touring Car Championship drivers